Line 2 on the Brussels Metro is a rapid transit line in Brussels, Belgium operated by STIB/MIVB. It exists in its current form since April 4, 2009, when the section between Delacroix metro station and Gare de l'Ouest/Weststation was opened, which allowed to close the loop from and to Simonis/Elisabeth. The configuration of the Simonis/Elisabeth metro station though does not allow trains on the line 2 to be able to perform the loop several consecutive times in the same direction, i.e. a train running clockwise from Elisabeth will have to run counterclockwise from Simonis. The two termini of line 2 have thus received different names: originally Simonis (Elisabeth) and Simonis (Leopold II), changed in November 2013 to Elisabeth and Simonis. Between the Yser/IJzer metro station and the Porte de Hal/Hallepoort station, the line runs under the small ring road of Brussels, which is itself built on the former Second walls of Brussels.

The first stations on the small ring road were opened in 1970 with tramways connecting Rogier station with Porte de Namur/Naamsepoort metro station. The Louise/Louiza metro station was opened in 1985 and the Simonis metro station in 1986 but it is only in 1988 that the actual metro line 2 was first serviced with metros. The following stations also opened that year: Ribaucourt, Yser/IJzer, Hôtel des Monnaies/Munthof metro station, Porte de Hal/Hallepoort and Brussels-South railway station. The existing stations were converted in order to be serviced by metros. In 1993 the line was expanded to the Clemenceau metro station, and then to Delacroix in 2006.  The route of line 2 is also currently served by line 6, which then continues from Simonis to King Baudouin metro station.

The line crosses the municipalities of Koekelberg, Molenbeek-Saint-Jean, City of Brussels, Saint-Gilles and Anderlecht.

References

External links
STIB/MIVB official website
Brussels metro and tram network map with date of entry into service of individual sections

2
Anderlecht
City of Brussels
Koekelberg
Saint-Gilles, Belgium
Molenbeek-Saint-Jean